Roberts County Courthouse may refer to:

Roberts County Courthouse (South Dakota), Sisseton, South Dakota
Roberts County Courthouse (Texas), Miami, Texas